Chenhamo "Chen" Chakezha Chimutengwende (born 28 August 1943) was the Minister of State for Public and Interactive Affairs in Zimbabwe and a longstanding supporter of Robert Mugabe. On 31 March 2008 he lost his parliamentary seat in the general election, which ended his 23-year career as a Member of Parliament. Since September 2009 he has been chairman of the Zimbabwe Foundation for Sustainable Development.

During the 1960s and 1970s Chimutengwende lived in exile in London, England, where he directed the Europe-Africa Research Project from a basement in Gower Street. He was a member of the editorial board of Red Mole, a paper closely associated with the International Marxist Group. A staunch supporter of Mao Zedong's China, he resigned from the editorial board when the paper criticised Mao's policies with regard to the Bangladesh Liberation War of 1971.

He earned a master's degree in social science from the University of Bradford, having specialized on "The Functions, Processes and Challenges of Mass Communications in Peaceful and Conflictual Situations in Politics and International Relations", and a PhD also from Bradford University, writing a thesis on "Mass Media and the State in the Socio-Economic Development Process". He is the author of the book South Africa: The Press and the Politics of Liberation (Barbican Books, London, 1978). After relations with Britain worsened during the early 2000s, Chimutengwende was largely used by the party as somewhat of a negotiator. He had many personal ties to London and many connections within British politics. His attempts at reconciliation did not bear much fruit however, as the tension between the governments of Tony Blair and Robert Mugabe continued to denounce one another in public. During the 2005 parliamentary election his opponent Shepherd Mushonga accused him of being hypocritical for supporting Mugabe. Chimutengwende responded by saying to a crowd in Mazowe: "I love England, that country will always have a special place in my heart, but I am a proud Zimbabwean and always will be." Shepherd Mushonga was notably in favour of Mugabe's controversial land reform program, whereas Chimutengwende was more introspective about the issue. Chimutengwende said his position was that he favoured land reform as such, and land redistibution in particular, but he did not think it was done in a good way. He was however noted for being "deeply loyal" to President Robert Mugabe. Chimutengwende won the election with 18,041 votes compared to 7,567 votes for Shepherd Mushonga and 386 votes for Gideon Chinogurei of ZAPU.

Since 2005, he is placed on the United States sanctions list.

References

External links
 "The Profile of Chen Chimutengwende", Afrika Global Network (AGN).
 "Chen Chimutengwende" at IMDB.

1943 births
Living people
20th-century Zimbabwean politicians
21st-century Zimbabwean politicians
Alumni of the University of Bradford
Members of the National Assembly of Zimbabwe
Members of the Senate of Zimbabwe
ZANU–PF politicians
Zimbabwean expatriates in the United Kingdom
Zimbabwean politicians